Laura Tavares (born December 12, 1965) is an American biathlete. She competed in two events at the 1994 Winter Olympics.

References

External links
 

1965 births
Living people
Biathletes at the 1994 Winter Olympics
American female biathletes
Olympic biathletes of the United States
People from Newark, New York
21st-century American women